Originally established in 2004 as 'Abrams Books UK', the London office was the subsidiary of the prominent French publisher La Martinière Groupe. Abrams encompassed Abrams Books, Abrams Image, Abrams ComicArts, Stewart, Tabori & Chang, Abrams Books for Young Readers, Amulet Books.

In June 2010, US publishers Abrams and Chronicle Books teamed up to create a joint marketing and distribution force to serve the UK and European markets.

The UK Abrams sales and marketing team, expanded to accommodate the Chronicle lists. It continues to be based in London. The joint venture is called Abrams & Chronicle Books.

The company continues to provide distribution services to US and International publishers and seek out new complementary lists. Books began shipping under from the new company on 1 July 2010 from the UK warehouse, at Littlehampton Book Services. In January 2019 the warehouse switched to the new Hachette UK distribution centre in Didcot 

Inez Munsch is the Managing Director of the company.

Abrams and Chronicle Books offers titles on art, photography, architecture, design, sport, gardening and food and wine. The company also publishes titles on popular culture, its craft list and its graphic novels. In addition the Chronicle brand has a range of gifts and stationery  by Jill Bliss, Nick McClure, David Chow and Susie Ghahremani. Recent high-profile publications include The Selby Is In Your Place, Art of Avatar, Avedon Fashion, Wisdom, Prada and Equus.

References

Book publishing companies of the United States
Book publishing companies of France
Multinational joint-venture companies
Publishing companies established in 2004